Rosencrantz and Guildenstern Are Undead is a 2009 American independent film written and directed by Jordan Galland. The film's title refers to a fictitious play-within-the-movie, which is a comic reinterpretation of Shakespeare’s Hamlet and its aftermath and whose title is a reference to the play Rosencrantz and Guildenstern Are Dead. The cast includes Devon Aoki, John Ventimiglia, Kris Lemche, Ralph Macchio, Jeremy Sisto and Waris Ahluwalia. The film stars Jake Hoffman (son of Dustin Hoffman).  An original musical score was composed and performed by Sean Lennon.

Shooting began in late November, 2007, and principal photography was completed on December 23, 2007. It was filmed entirely in New York City with the Red Digital Cinema Camera, an extra-high-definition video camera.

Plot summary
Julian Marsh (Jake Hoffman), an unemployed young lothario, is forced by his doctor dad (Chip Zien) to accept a job directing an off-Broadway play called Rosencrantz and Guildenstern Are Undead, which is described as a weird adaptation of Hamlet. The play has been written by a mysterious, pallid Romanian named Theo Horace (John Ventimiglia), a vampire who has just killed a young woman (Bijou Phillips). Unaware of the danger that surrounds Theo's play, Julian casts his best friend Vince (Kris Lemche) as Hamlet and uses his new job to impress his ex-girlfriend, Anna (Devon Aoki), an aspiring actress. To Julian's dismay, Anna has taken up with a shady businessman named Bobby Bianchi (Ralph Macchio), who has reputed ties to the Mafia. When Anna is cast as Ophelia, she slowly gets involved with Theo. The roles of Rosencrantz and Guildenstern in Theo's play are filled by Carlo (Carlos Velazquez) and Mickey (Mike Landry), two narcissistic actors as foolish as the characters they are cast to play. Opening night draws near and people begin to die. Two bumbling New York City detectives (Jeremy Sisto and Lou Carbonneau) chase suspects as the movie builds to its climactic sequence.

The play within the film

Theo's play, Rosencrantz and Guildenstern Are Undead, is revealed in short segments throughout the movie. Its basic plot points are that Hamlet's friend Horatio (played by Theo) is a master vampire, over 2000 years old, who had once lived in ancient Rome. Through a series of twists and turns, Hamlet and his simple-minded friends, Rosencrantz and Guildenstern, become vampires themselves. When Horatio attempts to turn Hamlet's girlfriend Ophelia into a vampire, she thwarts him by drowning herself first. Hamlet angrily confronts Horatio but discovers that one vampire cannot kill another. His only hope of reversing the curse that rendered him a vampire is to find the Holy Grail and drink from it. Horatio also becomes obsessed with finding the Grail in order to destroy it. The battle for the Grail between Hamlet and Horatio lasts for centuries and leads to the creation of four plays, each concealing a secret message. The first is Shakespeare's Hamlet, written at Horatio's bidding. The second is Rosencrantz and Guildenstern, written in the nineteenth century by W. S. Gilbert (half of the duo of Gilbert and Sullivan). The third is Tom Stoppard's Rosencrantz and Guildenstern Are Dead, written in 1964. The final play in the cycle is this one, Rosencrantz and Guildenstern Are Undead, written by Horatio himself under the name Theo Horace, with the purpose of luring the real Hamlet into a final confrontation.

Cast

Production

Jordan Galland first conceived of the name, Rosencrantz and Guildenstern Are Undead, after playing Rosencrantz in a high school production of Tom Stoppard's play Rosencrantz and Guildenstern Are Dead at the age of 14. Several years later he was introduced to Stoppard, who encouraged him to pursue the idea.  The film was shot in New York City at the end of 2007, using the Red Digital Cinema Camera (also known as The Red One), an ultra-high-definition video camera, which can record resolutions up to 4520 x 2540 using a Super 35-sized CMOS sensor. Galland, along with his editor, Connor Kalista, and cinematographer, Chris Lavasseur, presented their experience with the Red One at a content panel ("Case Study: Rosencrantz and Guildenstern Are Undead") at the National Association of Broadcasters convention (NABShow 2008), on April 15, 2008.

Soundtrack
Galland's longtime collaborator Sean Lennon has created an original musical score for the film.

Awards and nominations
2010 Comedy Award at the Washington DC Independent Film Festival
2009 Nominated for best production design at the Strasbourg Film Festival

Release
The film ran in a limited cinema release in the United States on 11 June 2010. It is distributed by Indican Pictures.

Film Festivals
World premiere at a special screening at the Slamdance Film Festival in January 2009.
 Canadian premiere at the Canadian Music Week Film Festival, March 14, 2009.
 Special Presentations screening at the American Film Institute Dallas International Film Festival, March 27 and 29, 2009.
 Feature film presentation at Newport Beach Film Festival, April 26, 2009.
 Feature film presentation at the Delray Beach Film Festival, May 24, 2009.
 East Coast premiere at the Stony Brook Film Festival, July 24, 2009.
European premiere, Strasbourg International Film Festival, September 6, 2009.
 Spotlight screening at the Friars Club Comedy Film Festival, September 26, 2009.
 Feature film screening at the Hollywood Film Festival, October 24, 2009.
 Middle East premiere: Icon Film Festival, October 10, 2009.
 Asian festival premiere at the Kaohsiung Film Festival, October 18, 20 and 24, 2009.
 Feature film screening, San Francisco Independent Film Festival, February 5 and 9, 2010.
 Feature film screening, Washington DC Independent Film Festival, March 13, 2010.
United States cinema release, June 11, 2010.

Critical reception
Website Metacritic assigned the film a 45 out of 100, indicating "mixed or average reviews".  Variety gave the film a fairly positive review stating: "Rosencrantz & Guildenstern Are Undead is one sly slice of the ridiculous."

References

Further reading

External links

 

2009 horror films
Films shot in New York City
American independent films
2009 comedy horror films
Vampire comedy films
2009 films
American comedy horror films
2009 comedy films
2009 independent films
2000s English-language films
2000s American films